Amanda Lourenço Nunes (born May 30, 1988) is a Brazilian professional mixed martial artist. She competes in the Ultimate Fighting Championship (UFC), where she is the current UFC Women's Featherweight Champion and two-time UFC Women's Bantamweight Champion. As of March 1, 2023, she is ranked #1 in the UFC women's pound-for-pound rankings.

Widely regarded as the greatest female mixed martial artist of all time, Nunes is the first woman to become a two-division UFC champion, and the third fighter to hold UFC titles in two weight classes simultaneously, after Conor McGregor and Daniel Cormier. She is also the first and only fighter to defend two UFC titles while holding both.

Early life
Amanda Lourenço Nunes was born on May 30, 1988, in Pojuca, a small town outside of Salvador, Bahia, Brazil, as a daughter of Ivete and Sindoval Nunes. She has two older sisters, Valdirene and Vanessa. After her parents split up when she was 4, Nunes and her sisters remained with their mother. To support the family as a single parent, Mrs. Ivete sold hot-dogs, sweets and beauty products alongside her regular job as a school administrative assistant. According to Nunes, her father initially did not support her fighting career, but has since changed course.

Nunes has described her mother, Ivete, as a loving but strict parent. Ivete encouraged Amanda to get involved with sports as a way to deal with her excess energy.

Nunes initially aspired to become a professional soccer player, starting out in elementary school as a player on the local Pojuca team and later on the Salvador team. Eventually, she got the opportunity to try out for the Vitória football club, but was unable to accept due to her mother wanting her to focus on studies instead.

Martial arts training 
Nunes's uncle, José Silva, was a Vale Tudo fighter. Her mother Ivete, who herself regularly trained boxing, cornered him during his fights. Nunes first attended capoeira classes at age five, after her school teacher complained that she was too hyperactive in class. She started learning karate at age seven.

At the age of 16, following her sister Vanessa's invitation to a dojo, she began training in Brazilian jiu-jitsu. At this time, she also got involved with boxing. Despite being the only woman at the gym, she soon started dominating her training partners in sparring. After she had defeated all of her opposition, at age 17, she moved to Salvador to train at the Edson Carvalho academy under the tutelage of his brother, Ricardo Carvalho. There, she also started training in judo. She lived at an apartment with her sister, but because it was too far away from the gym, she accepted her coach's offer to move there. Because she was the only girl, and because the logo of the academy are two lions, her coach and other students started calling her "Leoa" (lioness in Portuguese), a nickname she still uses.

Nunes soon started competing in BJJ tournaments. Among her biggest accomplishments in this sport are gold medal at the Pan American Jiu-Jitsu Championship in 2008 as a blue belt, gold medal at World Jiu-Jitsu Championship in 2009 as a purple belt and becoming a world champion of the North American Grappling Association (NAGA) in the lightweight and absolute divisions in 2012. She currently holds a black belt in BJJ and a brown belt in judo.

Nunes started training MMA in 2007 at Edson Carvalho's gym. After moving to the US, she lived in New Jersey and trained at AMA Fight Club before moving to Miami to train at MMA Masters. She is currently training at American Top Team in Coconut Creek, Florida.

Mixed martial arts career

Nunes made her professional debut on March 8, 2008, at Prime MMA Championship 2. She faced Ana Maria and was defeated by armbar submission in the first round.

Strikeforce
Nunes had won five straight fights, all by knockout prior to making her Strikeforce debut on January 7, 2011, at Strikeforce Challengers: Woodley vs. Saffiedine in Nashville, Tennessee. She defeated Canadian Julia Budd by knockout in just 14 seconds.

Nunes was scheduled to fight Julie Kedzie at Strikeforce: Overeem vs. Werdum on June 18, 2011, in Dallas, Texas. The bout was cancelled after Nunes sustained a foot injury.

Nunes fought Alexis Davis on September 10, 2011, at Strikeforce: Barnett vs. Kharitonov. She lost the fight via TKO late in the second round. In the first round, Nunes started strongly with heavy strikes, but quickly faded. By the second round, Nunes was exhausted from the start of the round. While attempting a takedown she was instantly reversed and Davis was able to obtain full mount to finish Nunes with strikes.

Nunes signed to face Cat Zingano at Strikeforce: Melendez vs. Healy on September 29, 2012, but the event was cancelled when Gilbert Melendez, who was set to defend his title against Pat Healy, sustained a knee injury in training that forced his withdrawal from the card.

Invicta FC
Nunes was scheduled to face Milana Dudieva at Invicta FC 2: Baszler vs. McMann on July 28, 2012. Dudieva withdrew from the fight due to illness on July 9 and Nunes was then scheduled to face Leslie Smith instead. Smith also withdrew due to an injury and Nunes ultimately faced Raquel Pa'aluhi. Nunes won the fight via technical submission due to a rear-naked choke in the first round.

On January 5, 2013, Nunes returned to Invicta FC to face Sarah D'Alelio at Invicta FC 4: Esparza vs. Hyatt. Nunes lost the fight via unanimous decision.

Nunes was scheduled to face Kaitlin Young at Invicta FC 5: Penne vs. Waterson on April 5, 2013. She withdrew due to an arm injury.

Ultimate Fighting Championship
Nunes made her Octagon debut against Sheila Gaff at UFC 163 on August 3, 2013, in Brazil. She won the fight via TKO in the first round.

Nunes made her second UFC appearance when she faced Germaine de Randamie at UFC Fight Night 31 on November 6, 2013. She won the fight via TKO in the first round.

For her third fight with the promotion, Nunes was named the injury replacement for Shayna Baszler against Sarah Kaufman at The Ultimate Fighter Nations Finale. Nunes later pulled out of the bout with a dislocated thumb.

Nunes faced Cat Zingano on September 27, 2014, at UFC 178. After nearly finishing Zingano with punches in the first round, she lost the next round before being finished via TKO in the third round.

Nunes faced Shayna Baszler on March 21, 2015, at UFC Fight Night 62. She won the fight via TKO in the first round.

Nunes faced Sara McMann on August 8, 2015, at UFC Fight Night 73. She won the fight via a rear-naked choke submission in the first round, after knocking her opponent down with a three punch combination.

Nunes faced Valentina Shevchenko on March 5, 2016, at UFC 196. She won the fight by unanimous decision (29–28, 29–27, and 29–27).

Bantamweight and Featherweight Champion
After amassing a three-fight win streak, Nunes earned her first title shot in the UFC. She faced Miesha Tate for the UFC Women's Bantamweight Championship on July 9, 2016, at UFC 200. Nunes stunned Tate early on with knees and punches and then won the fight by submission (rear-naked choke) in the first round. Her victory made her the first openly gay UFC champion.

On December 30, 2016, Nunes made her first title defense against returning MMA superstar Ronda Rousey in the main event at UFC 207. Nunes won the fight via TKO due to punches 48 seconds into the first round.

For her second title defense, Nunes was scheduled to face Valentina Shevchenko in a rematch at UFC 213 on July 8, 2017. The pair originally fought at UFC 196, with Nunes winning by unanimous decision. Nunes was hospitalized the morning of the fight with chronic sinusitis and the fight was cancelled. Joanna Jędrzejczyk offered to replace Nunes, but the Nevada State Athletic Commission could not clear her on such short notice. Nunes instead fought Shevchenko at UFC 215 on September 9 in Edmonton, Alberta. Nunes won the closely contested fight by split decision. Out of 22 media outlets, 10 scored it for Nunes, 10 for Shevchenko, and 2 scored it a draw.

Nunes faced Raquel Pennington on May 12, 2018, at UFC 224. After a dominant performance, Nunes finished the fight with ground and pound at 2:36 of round five. This was the first UFC event headlined by two openly gay fighters.

Nunes moved up in weight to face Cris Cyborg for the UFC Women's Featherweight Championship on December 29, 2018, at UFC 232. Nunes knocked Cyborg out in 51 seconds of the first round to become the new UFC Women’s Featherweight Champion. This made her the first woman in UFC to hold championship belts in different divisions simultaneously. This win also earned her the Performance of the Night award.

Nunes returned to bantamweight to make her fourth title defense against former champion Holly Holm on July 6, 2019, at UFC 239. She won the fight via knockout in round one after dropping Holm with a head kick and following up with punches. This win earned her the Performance of the Night award.

Nunes faced Germaine de Randamie on December 14, 2019, at UFC 245 to defend her UFC Women's Bantamweight Championship. After outgrappling her opponent in every round, she won the fight via unanimous decision (49–44, 49–46, and 49–45). This win meant Nunes had the most wins in women’s title fights in the UFC, with seven such wins.

Nunes was expected to face Felicia Spencer on May 9, 2020, at then UFC 250. On April 9, Dana White, president of the UFC announced that this event was postponed The bout eventually took place on June 6, 2020, at UFC 250. Nunes won via unanimous decision (50–44, 50–44, and 50–45).

Nunes was expected to defend her featherweight title against Megan Anderson in December 2020 at UFC 256. It was announced on November 9 that Nunes pulled out due to an undisclosed injury and the bout was postponed to 2021. The pairing was rescheduled for March 6, 2021 at UFC 259. Nunes won the fight via triangle armbar in round one.

Nunes was expected to defend her bantamweight title on August 7, 2021, at UFC 265 against Julianna Peña. Nunes tested positive for COVID-19 on July 29 and the bout was cancelled. The fight was rescheduled and eventually took place at UFC 269 on December 11, 2021. After dominating the first round, Nunes was outstruck in the second round, and eventually submitted via rear-naked choke, losing her bantamweight championship in a massive upset.

On February 5, 2022,  it was announced that Nunes and Julianna Peña  will be the coaches for The Ultimate Fighter 30 at ESPN+ and the show featured heavyweight and women's flyweight contestants.

A rematch against Julianna Peña for the UFC Women's Bantamweight title took place on July 30, 2022, at UFC 277. Nunes recaptured the title in a 5-round dominant unanimous decision victory over Peña, and became the first person in UFC history, of either gender to become double champ twice. Nunes received Crypto.com "Fan Bonus of the Night" awards paid in bitcoin of US$30,000 for first place for this fight.

Personal life
Nunes is the first openly lesbian UFC champion. She is married to former UFC fighter Nina Nunes (née Ansaroff), who competed in the strawweight division. She credits her UFC success to their relationship. On September 24, 2020, her wife gave birth to the couple's first child, a daughter.

Championships and accomplishments
 Ultimate Fighting Championship
 UFC Women's Bantamweight Championship (two times, current)
 Five successful title defenses
 UFC Women’s Featherweight Championship (one time; current)
 Two successful title defenses 
 First woman in UFC to win two titles (bantamweight and featherweight) and to also hold them simultaneously
 First fighter in UFC to defend titles in two divisions while holding both titles simultaneously
 Sixth multi-divisional champion in UFC and third to hold two titles simultaneously (after Daniel Cormier and Conor McGregor)
 Longest combined UFC title reign of all time ( days).
 Fourth longest single UFC title reign of all time (1981 days) (behind Demetrious Johnson, Georges St-Pierre and Anderson Silva)
 Performance of the Night (five times) vs. Sara McMann, Miesha Tate, Ronda Rousey, Cris Cyborg and Holly Holm
 Tied (Jéssica Andrade) for most wins in UFC Women's history (15)
 Most wins in UFC title fights amongst women (10)
 Most knockout wins in UFC women's bantamweight division (6)
 Most finishes in UFC Women's history (10)
 Most finishes in UFC women's bantamweight division (8)
 Most consecutive wins by a woman in UFC (12)
 Most consecutive wins in the UFC women's bantamweight division (9)
 Tied for most consecutive wins in the UFC women's featherweight division (3) (w. Cris Cyborg)
 Most wins in UFC women's bantamweight division (12)
 Most wins in UFC Women's Bantamweight Championship fights (7)
 Tied for most wins in UFC Women's Featherweight Championship fights (3) (w. Cris Cyborg)
 Holds wins over seven former or current UFC champions — Miesha Tate, Ronda Rousey, Valentina Shevchenko (twice), Holly Holm, Germaine de Randamie (twice), Cris Cyborg, and Julianna Peña
 2015 August Submission of the Month vs. Sara McMann
 2018 Female Fighter of the Year
 2019 Female Fighter of the Year
 CombatPress.com
 2018 Upset of the Year vs. Cris Cyborg
 2018 Female Fighter of the Year
 2019 Female Fighter of the Year
 MMA Weekly
 2018 Knockout of the Year vs. Cris Cyborg
 Equality California
 2016 Equality Visibility Award
 MMADNA.nl
 2016 Female Fighter of the Year
 2018 Female Fighter of the Year
 World MMA Awards
 2016 Female Fighter of the Year
 2018 Female Fighter of the Year
 2018 Knockout of the Year vs. Cris Cyborg at UFC 232
 2018 Upset of the Year vs. Cris Cyborg at UFC 232
 2019 – July 2020 Female Fighter of the Year

Mixed martial arts record

|-
|Win
|align=center|22–5
|Julianna Peña
|Decision (unanimous)
|UFC 277
|
|align=center|5
|align=center|5:00
|Dallas, Texas, United States
|
|-
|Loss
|align=center|21–5
|Julianna Peña
|Submission (rear-naked choke)
|UFC 269
|
|align=center|2
|align=center|3:26
|Las Vegas, Nevada, United States
|
|-
|Win
|align=center|21–4
|Megan Anderson
|Submission (reverse triangle armbar)
|UFC 259
|
|align=center|1
|align=center|2:03
|Las Vegas, Nevada, United States
|
|-
|Win
|align=center|20–4
|Felicia Spencer
|Decision (unanimous)
|UFC 250
|
|align=center|5
|align=center|5:00
|Las Vegas, Nevada, United States
|
|-
|Win
|align=center|19–4
|Germaine de Randamie
|Decision (unanimous)
|UFC 245
|
|align=center|5
|align=center|5:00
|Las Vegas, Nevada, United States
|
|-
|Win
|align=center|18–4
|Holly Holm
|TKO (head kick and punches)
|UFC 239 
|
|align=center|1
|align=center|4:10
|Las Vegas, Nevada, United States
|
|-
|Win
|align=center|17–4
|Cris Cyborg
|KO (punch)
|UFC 232
|
|align=center|1
|align=center|0:51
|Inglewood, California, United States
|
|-
|Win
|align=center|16–4
|Raquel Pennington
|TKO (elbows and punches)
|UFC 224
|
|align=center|5
|align=center|2:36
|Rio de Janeiro, Brazil
|
|-
| Win
|align=center|15–4
|Valentina Shevchenko
|Decision (split) 
|UFC 215
|
|align=center|5
|align=center|5:00
|Edmonton, Alberta, Canada
|
|-
|Win
|align=center|14–4
|Ronda Rousey
|TKO (punches)
|UFC 207
|
|align=center|1
|align=center|0:48
|Las Vegas, Nevada, United States
|
|-
|Win
|align=center|13–4
|Miesha Tate
|Submission (rear-naked choke)
|UFC 200
|
|align=center|1
|align=center|3:16
|Las Vegas, Nevada, United States
|
|-
|Win
|align=center|12–4
|Valentina Shevchenko
|Decision (unanimous)
|UFC 196
|
|align=center|3
|align=center|5:00
|Las Vegas, Nevada, United States
|
|-
| Win
| align=center| 11–4
| Sara McMann
| Submission (rear-naked choke)
| UFC Fight Night: Teixeira vs. Saint Preux
| 
| align=center| 1
| align=center| 2:53
| Nashville, Tennessee, United States
| 
|-
| Win
| align=center| 10–4
| Shayna Baszler
| TKO (leg kick)
| UFC Fight Night: Maia vs. LaFlare
| 
| align=center| 1
| align=center| 1:56
| Rio de Janeiro, Brazil
| 
|-
| Loss
| align=center| 9–4
| Cat Zingano
| TKO (elbows and punches)
| UFC 178
| 
| align=center| 3
| align=center| 1:21
| Las Vegas, Nevada, United States
| 
|-
| Win
| align=center| 9–3
| Germaine de Randamie
| TKO (elbows)
| UFC: Fight for the Troops 3
| 
| align=center| 1
| align=center| 3:56
| Fort Campbell, Kentucky, United States
| 
|-
| Win
| align=center| 8–3
| Sheila Gaff
| TKO (punches and elbows)
| UFC 163
| 
| align=center| 1
| align=center| 2:08
| Rio de Janeiro, Brazil
| 
|-
| Loss
| align=center| 7–3
| Sarah D'Alelio
| Decision (unanimous)
| Invicta FC 4: Esparza vs. Hyatt
| 
| align=center| 3
| align=center| 5:00
| Kansas City, Kansas, United States
| 
|-
| Win
| align=center| 7–2
| Raquel Pa'aluhi
| Technical Submission (rear-naked choke)
| Invicta FC 2: Baszler vs. McMann
| 
| align=center| 1
| align=center| 2:24
| Kansas City, Kansas, United States
| 
|-
| Loss
| align=center| 6–2
| Alexis Davis
| TKO (punches)
| Strikeforce: Barnett vs. Kharitonov
| 
| align=center| 2
| align=center| 4:53
| Cincinnati, Ohio, United States
|
|-
| Win
| align=center| 6–1
| Julia Budd
| KO (punches)
| Strikeforce Challengers: Woodley vs. Saffiedine
| 
| align=center| 1
| align=center| 0:14
| Nashville, Tennessee, United States
| 
|-
| Win
| align=center| 5–1
| Ediane Gomes
| TKO (punches)
| Bitetti Combat 6
| 
| align=center| 2
| align=center| 3:00
| Brasília, Brazil
| 
|-
| Win
| align=center| 4–1
| Vanessa Porto
| TKO (corner stoppage)
| Samurai FC 2: Warrior's Return
| 
| align=center| 2
| align=center| 5:00
| Curitiba, Brazil
| 
|-
| Win
| align=center| 3–1
| Deise Lee Rocha
| TKO (punches)
| Samurai Fight Combat
| 
| align=center| 1
| align=center| 1:08
| Curitiba, Brazil
| 
|-
| Win
| align=center| 2–1
| Nadja Nadja
| TKO (punches)
| Prime: MMA Championship 3
| 
| align=center| 1
| align=center| 0:10
| Salvador, Brazil
| 
|-
| Win
| align=center| 1–1
| Paty Barbosa
| TKO (corner stoppage)
| Demo Fight 3
| 
| align=center| 1
| align=center| 0:11
| Salvador, Brazil
| 
|-
| Loss
| align=center| 0–1
| Ana Maria 
| Submission (armbar)
| Prime: MMA Championship 2
| 
| align=center| 1
| align=center| 0:35
| Salvador, Brazil
| 
|}

See also
 List of current UFC fighters
 List of female mixed martial artists

References

External links
 
 

|-

|-

 

Living people
1988 births
Brazilian female mixed martial artists
Sportspeople from Salvador, Bahia
Bantamweight mixed martial artists
Featherweight mixed martial artists
Mixed martial artists utilizing judo
Mixed martial artists utilizing Brazilian jiu-jitsu
Brazilian female judoka
Brazilian practitioners of Brazilian jiu-jitsu
People awarded a black belt in Brazilian jiu-jitsu
Female Brazilian jiu-jitsu practitioners
LGBT mixed martial artists
Ultimate Fighting Championship champions
Lesbian sportswomen
Brazilian LGBT sportspeople
Brazilian lesbians
Ultimate Fighting Championship female fighters
LGBT Brazilian jiu-jitsu practitioners
LGBT judoka
21st-century Brazilian LGBT people